Molindone, sold under the brand name Moban, is an antipsychotic which is used in the United States in the treatment of schizophrenia. It works by blocking the effects of dopamine in the brain, leading to diminished symptoms of psychosis. It is rapidly absorbed when taken orally.

It is sometimes described as a typical antipsychotic, and sometimes described as an atypical antipsychotic.

Molindone was discontinued by its original supplier, Endo Pharmaceuticals, on January 13, 2010.

Availability and Marketing in the USA 
After having been produced and subsequently discontinued by Core Pharma in 2015-2017, Molindone is available again from Epic Pharma effective December, 2018.

Adverse effects

The side effect profile of molindone is similar to that of other typical antipsychotics. Unlike most antipsychotics, however, molindone use is associated with weight loss.

Chemistry

Synthesis

Condensation of oximinoketone 2 (from nitrosation of 3-pentanone), with cyclohexane-1,3-dione (1) in the presence of zinc and acetic acid leads directly to the partly reduced indole derivative 6. The transformation may be rationalized by assuming as the first step,  reduction of 2 to the corresponding α-aminoketone. Conjugate addition of the amine to 1 followed by elimination of hydroxide (as water) would give ene-aminoketone 3. This enamine may be assumed to be in tautomeric equilibrium with imine 4. Aldol condensation of the side chain carbonyl group with the doubly activated ring methylene group would then result in cyclization to pyrrole 5; simple tautomeric transformation would then give the observed product. Mannich reaction of 6 with formaldehyde and morpholine gives the tranquilizer molindone (7).

See also
 L-741,626
 Losindole
 Piquindone

References

Antipsychotics
Indoles
Ketones
4-Morpholinyl compunds